Haverfordwest Priory was a house of Augustinian Canons Regular on the banks of the Western Cleddau at Haverfordwest, Pembrokeshire, Wales. Dedicated to St. Mary and St. Thomas the Martyr and situated on land given by Robert fitz-Richard, castellan of Haverford Castle and second cousin of Gerald of Wales. The priory was first mentioned around 1200.

According to  William Latham Bevan, “It owned the three churches in Haverfordwest, Haroldston St. Issell's, adjacent to it, Llanstadwell, Dale, Lambston, Camrose, Llanwynio, St. Ishmael's (Milford Haven), Reynalton, and a chapel now extinct named Cristiswell, probably situated at Cresswell Quay, near Cresselly.

At the time of Henry VIII’s Dissolution of the Monasteries (1536–1541), it was acquired by Roger and Thomas Barlow, brothers of William Barlow, bishop of St David's.

From 1983 to 1996, the site (now under control of Cadw) was excavated and the outlines of the buildings are visible.  Much architectural material of a high standard was discovered and can be seen in Haverfordwest museum.  Also unearthed was a unique medieval garden with raised beds. The gardens are listed at Grade I on the Cadw/ICOMOS Register of Parks and Gardens of Special Historic Interest in Wales.

References

Augustinian monasteries in Wales
History of Pembrokeshire
Grade I listed buildings in Pembrokeshire
Archaeological sites in Pembrokeshire
Ruins in Wales
Priory
Scheduled monuments in Pembrokeshire
Registered historic parks and gardens in Pembrokeshire